Andrew Thomas Ratcliffe (3 May 1891 – 31 August 1974) was an Australian cricketer. He played 43 first-class matches, mostly for New South Wales, between 1913/14 and 1928/29.

A wicketkeeper-batsman, Ratcliffe's highest first-class score was 161 for an Australian XI against New South Wales in October 1924, out of a team total of 310. He toured New Zealand in 1920–21 with the Australians, playing in the two matches against New Zealand. He captained New South Wales against the touring New Zealanders in January 1926, scoring 128.

See also
 List of New South Wales representative cricketers

References

External links
 

1891 births
1974 deaths
Australian cricketers
New South Wales cricketers
Cricketers from Sydney